The Cambridge Bible for Schools and Colleges is a biblical commentary set published in parts by Cambridge University Press from 1882 onwards. Anglican bishop John Perowne was the general editor. The first section published was written by theologian Thomas Kelly Cheyne and covered the Book of Micah.

Perowne exercised limited editorial control over the writers of individual commentaries: his aim was "to leave each contributor to the unfettered exercise of his own judgment".

Contributors

Notes

External links 
An HTML version of the text is available online at the BibleHub.

Facsimiles of the individual printed volumes are available on various websites: Introduction to the Pentateuch, Genesis (US access only), Exodus, Leviticus, Numbers, Deuteronomy,  Joshua, Judges and Ruth, 1 Samuel, 2 Samuel,  1 Kings, 2 Kings, Chronicles, Ezra and Nehemiah, Esther, 1 Maccabees, Job, Psalms 1-41, Psalms 90-150, Ecclesiastes, Solomon, Isaiah 1-39, Jeremiah and Lamentations, Ezekiel, Daniel, Hosea, Joel and Amos,  Obadiah and Jonah, Micah, Nahum, Habakkuk, and Zephaniah, Haggai and Zechariah. Mark, Luke, John, Acts, Romans, Ephesians, Philippians, Colossians and Philemon, 1 & 2 Thessalonians, Timothy and Titus, Hebrews, James, 1 & 2 Peter and Jude, 1-3 John (US access only), Revelation.

References

Biblical commentaries
Cambridge University Press